Shaani or Shanee is a 1989 Pakistani science fiction film directed by Saeed Rizvi and starring Babra Sharif, Sheri Malik, Ghulam Mohiuddin, Asif Khan, Saeed Rizvi and Mohammad Ali. The film is famous for its special effects which were first used in Pakistan.

Awards
The film won four Nigar Awards in 1989. The film also does not have any songs which according to director Saeed Rizvi, increased his belief in special effects.

Plot
Shanee begins with a glowing space ship that arrives in the middle of the forest near a village. A glowing figure appears and follows a terrified Babra Sharif to her house where he decides to assume the appearance of a young man he happens to view in a lovingly framed photograph. He is greeted with open arms by the villagers and especially by a blushing Babra and her family for unknown to the spaceman that he has assumed the appearance of Shanee the man who Babra was due to marry and who was supposedly brutally murdered by a villainous goon by the name of Shamsher Khan (Asif Khan).

The fake Shanee lands in the thick of it upon his arrival because when he refuses to marry her as everyone expected, she blackmails him and forces him to change his mind. Anyway, all appears hunky dory and Shanee even turns his nose up at going home defying orders from his planet claiming that he has fallen for the ways of the humans! Then one fine day things turn nasty when evil goon Shamsher Khan, king of flesh trade discovers that the thorn he thought he had extracted once and for all has resurfaced to threaten him once again.

While trying to fight for the man whose identity he took on, due to the feeling of obligation he falls in love with Babra Sharif.  The alien who landed on Earth came in search of a planet where his people are able to survive but after falling in love, will he be able to return to his people and his land after the hate against humanity that they have seen?

Cast 
 Babra Sharif
 Sheri Malik as Shaani
 Ghulam Mohiuddin
 Mohammad Ali
 Asif Khan
 Saeed Rizvi
 Nayyar Sultana

References

External links
 

1980s science fiction action films
1980s Urdu-language films
1989 films
Shanee
Nigar Award winners
Films with live action and animation
Films about revenge
Shanee
Science fiction action films
Pakistani pregnancy films
Urdu-language Pakistani films